Julius Leon "Jule" Rivlin (February 2, 1917 – September 23, 2002) was a college men's basketball coach and professional basketball player. He was the head coach of Marshall from 1955 to 1963. He coached Marshall to a 100-88 record, winning one Mid-American Conference championship and making one NCAA tournament appearance.

Rivlin played college basketball at Marshall before playing three seasons in the National Basketball League for the Akron Goodyear Wingfoots and the Toledo Jeeps, with a break for service in World War II at Fort Warren, Wyoming.

Prior to the war, Jules played semi-pro basketball for the Clarksburg (West Virginia) Pure Oilers where he was a close friend and teammate of Press Maravich (father of "Pistol" Pete Maravich).

Rivlin also served as the Jeeps' coach. In 1947, he was named the World Professional Basketball Tournament's MVP.  In 1974, Julie coached Maccabi Union's basketball team to the Europe Maccabiah Games Championships. Rivlin was named second team All-Century Marshall University Basketball Team, and is a member of the West Virginia Sports Hall of Fame.

Head coaching record

References

 

1917 births
2002 deaths
Akron Goodyear Wingfoots players
Amateur Athletic Union men's basketball players
American men's basketball players
Basketball coaches from Pennsylvania
Basketball coaches from West Virginia
Basketball players from Pittsburgh
Basketball players from West Virginia
Guards (basketball)
Jewish men's basketball players
Marshall Thundering Herd men's basketball coaches
Marshall Thundering Herd men's basketball players
Player-coaches
Sportspeople from Pittsburgh
Toledo Jeeps coaches
Toledo Jeeps players